Shawnee is a crater in the Oxia Palus quadrangle of Mars.  It was named after the town of Shawnee, Ohio in 1976.

Shawnee is located north of the craters Lod, Bok, and Bled in Ares Vallis.

References 

Oxia Palus quadrangle
Impact craters on Mars